Soldier's Reminder (Swedish: Krigsmans erinran) is a 1947 Swedish drama film directed by Hampe Faustman and starring Elof Ahrle, Birgit Tengroth and Gunnar Björnstrand. It was shot at the Råsunda Studios in Stockholm. The film's sets were designed by the art director Arne Åkermark.

Cast
 Elof Ahrle as 	Jocke Svensson
 Birgit Tengroth as 	Sickan
 Gunnar Björnstrand as 	Sgt. Löfgren
 Harriett Philipson as 	Eva
 Bengt Eklund as 	Vaterson
 Sven-Eric Gamble as 	Svenne
 Naemi Briese as 	Margit Andersson
 Ulf Palme as 	Jerker
 Artur Rolén as Manager
 Josua Bengtson as 	Lundin
 Åke Fridell as 	Åkesson
 David Erikson as Persson
 Lillie Wästfeldt as 	Mrs. Persson 
 Rune Stylander as 	Policeman
 Ivar Kåge as Vicar 
 Torsten Bergström as 	Major

References

Bibliography 
 Qvist, Per Olov & von Bagh, Peter. Guide to the Cinema of Sweden and Finland. Greenwood Publishing Group, 2000.

External links 
 

1947 films
Swedish drama films
1947 drama films
1940s Swedish-language films
Films directed by Hampe Faustman
1940s Swedish films